Ramsan is an island in the Stockholm archipelago, and part of the Norrtälje Municipality, located in Sweden.

In the past the island was owned by farmers living on the mainland who used it for hunting, fishing and letting the cows out to pasture.

Currently the island is being used as a summer resort.   
 

Islands of the Stockholm archipelago